Syndal railway station is located on the Glen Waverley line in Victoria, Australia. It serves the eastern Melbourne suburb of Glen Waverley, and opened on 5 May 1930.

History

Syndal station opened on 5 May 1930, when the railway line from East Malvern was extended to Glen Waverley. The station gets its name from a nearby property owned by Sir Redmond Barry, a major figure in the development of the area.

In 1958, the line was duplicated between Mount Waverley and Syndal and, in 1964, the current island platform was provided, when the line was duplicated between Syndal and Glen Waverley.

On 20 November 1989, the station was the site of a collision involving Hitachi and Comeng train sets. The incident occurred after the 7.49am train from Glen Waverley passed a red signal, and collided with the 7.46am train from Glen Waverley, at a speed of roughly 40 km/h. The 7.46am was stationary at Syndal due to a problem with the doors closing when the collision happened. 75 people were injured in the collision. The lead carriage of the 7.49am train, Hitachi 90M, was later scrapped due to the collision.

In 2015, the station was upgraded to include an additional 250 car parking spaces, with a new multi-deck car park, improved lighting, the installation of CCTV cameras, as well as enhanced pedestrian access. On 26 October of that year, the multi-deck car park officially opened.

Platforms and services

Syndal has one island platform with two faces. It is served by Glen Waverley line trains.

Platform 1:
  all stations and limited express services to Flinders Street

Platform 2:
  services to Glen Waverley

Transport Links

Ventura Bus Lines operates two routes via Syndal station, under contract to Public Transport Victoria:
  : Middle Brighton station – Blackburn station
 : Croydon station – Monash University Clayton Campus

Gallery

References

External links
 Melway map at street-directory.com.au

Railway stations in Melbourne
Railway stations in Australia opened in 1930
Railway stations in the City of Monash